David Lane may refer to:

Academics
 David J. Lane (astronomer) (born 1963), Canadian astronomer at Saint Mary's University
 David A. Lane (born 1945), American professor of statistics and economics at the University of Modena and Reggio Emilia
 David C. Lane (born 1956), American professor of philosophy
 David Lane (oncologist) (born 1952), British researcher and discoverer of the p53 gene

Entertainment
 David Lane (director) (born 1940), British television and film director
 David Lane (musician) (born 1981), Australian musician with You Am I
 David Ian (David Ian Lane, born 1961), English stage actor and producer

Politics
 David J. Lane (ambassador) (born 1960), U.S. ambassador to the United Nations Agencies for Food and Agriculture
 David Lane (British politician) (1922–1998), British Conservative Party politician
 David Lane (activist) (born c. 1955), American social conservative Christian activist
 David Lane (Massachusetts politician) (1927–2020), Massachusetts state representative

Other
 David Lane (cricketer) (born 1965), Montserratian cricketer
 David Lane (white supremacist) (1938–2007), American white supremacist